The 1933 Arizona Wildcats football team represented the University of Arizona in the Border Conference during the 1933 college football season.  In their first season under head coach Tex Oliver, the Wildcats compiled a 5–3 record (3–2 against Border opponents), finished in third place in the conference, and outscored their opponents, 113 to 35. The team captain was Clarence Sample.  The team played its home games at Arizona Stadium in Tucson, Arizona.

Schedule

References

Arizona
Arizona Wildcats football seasons
Arizona Wildcats football